"Please Stay", also known as "(Don't Go) Please Stay", is one of songwriter Burt Bacharach's early pop hits. It is an early hit of The Drifters featuring the new lead singer Rudy Lewis, who replaced Ben E. King and features Dionne Warwick's sister Dee Dee Warwick and Doris Troy on background vocals. This song, along with "Some Kind of Wonderful" and "Sweets for My Sweet", were recorded in the same session.

Backing musicians
The musicians who backed the Drifters on this record include George Barnes and Allan Hanlon on guitar, Abie Baker on bass, Bobby Rosengarden and Ray Kessler on percussion and Ed Shaughnessy and Gary Chester on drums.

Chart performance
In the US, "Please Stay" went to No. 13 on the R&B sides chart, and No. 14 on the Hot 100.

Notable cover versions
The song has been covered extensively:  
The Cryin' Shames released a version in 1966 which reached number 26 in the UK.
Jonathan Butler's 1975 version reached number 2 in South Africa.
The Love Affair released a version on their album The Everlasting Love Affair in 1968.
 [Bay City Rollers] released a version on their 1974 album Rollin’ 
 Marc Almond and Mekon also recorded a version in 2001.
 Duffy released a version on the Deluxe Edition of her debut album Rockferry.
 Elvis Costello released a version on his 1995 covers album Kojak Variety.
 [Ali Campbell] released a version from his album, Running Free [2007] The track name was changed to "Don't Go".

References

1961 songs
The Drifters songs
1961 singles
Lulu (singer) songs
Songs with lyrics by Bob Hilliard
Songs with music by Burt Bacharach
Atlantic Records singles